Hexaplex kuesterianus bozzadamii is a subspecies of sea snail, a marine gastropod mollusk in the family Muricidae, the murex snails or rock snails.

Description

Distribution
This marine species occurs off Somalia.

References

 Franchi F. (1990). A new Muricanthus from the Indian Ocean. La Conchiglia 256: 43-45. page(s): 43-45 

Muricidae
Gastropods described in 1990